In applied mathematics, polyharmonic splines are used for function approximation and data interpolation.  They are very useful for interpolating and fitting scattered data in many dimensions. Special cases include thin plate splines and natural cubic splines in one dimension.

Definition 
A polyharmonic spline is a linear combination of polyharmonic radial basis functions (RBFs) denoted by  plus a polynomial term:

where

  ( denotes matrix transpose, meaning  is a column vector) is a real-valued vector of  independent variables,
  are the  weights of the RBFs,
  are the  weights of the polynomial.

The polynomial with the coefficients  improves fitting accuracy for polyharmonic smoothing splines and also improves extrapolation away from the centers  See figure below for comparison of splines with polynomial term and without polynomial term.

The polyharmonic RBFs are of the form:

Other values of the exponent  are not useful (such as ), because a solution of the interpolation problem might not exist.

or, more simply adding a continuity extension in 

All together, these constraints are equivalent to the symmetric linear system of equations

where

In order for this system of equations to have a unique solution,  must be full rank.   is full rank for very mild conditions on the input data. For example, in two dimensions, three centers forming a non-degenerate triangle ensure that  is full rank, and in three dimensions, four centers forming a non-degenerate tetrahedron ensure that B is full rank. This means that if  is full rank, the system of equations always has a unique solution and it can be solved using a linear solver specialised for symmetric matrices. The computed weights allow evaluation of the spline for any  using equation. Many practical details of implementing and using polyharmonic splines are explained in Fasshauer. In Iske polyharmonic splines are treated as special cases of other multiresolution methods in scattered data modelling.

Reason for the name "polyharmonic" 
A polyharmonic equation is a partial differential equation of the form  for any natural number , where  is the Laplace operator. All the polyharmonic radial basis functions are solutions of a polyharmonic equation (or more accurately, a modified polyharmonic equation with a Dirac delta function on the right hand side instead of 0). For example, the thin plate radial basis function is a solution of the modified 2-dimensional biharmonic equation. Applying the 2D Laplace operator to the thin plate radial basis function  either by hand or using a computer algebra system shows that . But 0 is not exactly correct. The Laplace operator applied to  yields . For  the right hand side of this equation approaches infinity as  approaches 0. For any other , the right hand side approaches 0 as  approaches 0. This indicates that the right hand side is a Dirac delta function. A computer algebra system will show that

So the thin plate radial basis function is a solution of the equation .

Applying the 3D Laplacian to the biharmonic RBF  yields  and applying the 3D  operator to the triharmonic RBF  yields .  Letting  and computing  again indicates that the right hand side of the PDEs for the biharmonic and triharmonic RBFs are Dirac delta functions.  Since

Polyharmonic smoothing splines 
Polyharmonic splines minimize

In 2D  making the integral the simplified thin plate energy functional.

To show that polyharmonic splines minimize equation, the fitting term must be transformed into an integral using the definition of the Dirac delta function:

So equation can be written as the functional

where  is a multi-index that ranges over all partial derivatives of order  for   In order to apply the Euler–Lagrange equation for a single function of multiple variables and higher order derivatives, the quantities

and

are needed.  Inserting these quantities into the  E−L equation shows that

A weak solution  of  satisfies

for all smooth test functions  that vanish outside of   A weak solution of equation will still minimize while getting rid of the delta function through integration.

Let  be a polyharmonic spline as defined by equation.  The following calculations will show that  satisfies.  Applying the  operator to equation yields

where   and   So is equivalent to

(which implies interpolation if ). For example, for the 3D triharmonic RBFs,  is replaced with

Explanation of additional constraints 
In, the bottom half of the system of equations is given without explanation.  The explanation first requires deriving a simplified form of  when  is all of 

First, require that   This ensures that all derivatives of order  and higher of  vanish at infinity. For a given center 

On a line  for arbitrary point  and unit vector 

Dividing both numerator and denominator of this by  shows that  a quantity independent of the center   So on the given line,

Consider the behavior of these terms on the line  as  approaches infinity. The numerator is a degree 5 polynomial in   Dividing numerator and denominator by  leaves the degree 4 and 5 terms in the numerator and a function of  only in the denominator. The  constraint makes the first type of term vanish everywhere on the line. The additional constraints  will make the second type of term vanish.

Integration by parts shows that

For example, let  and   Then

Integrating the first term of this by parts once yields

since  vanishes at infinity.  Integrating by parts again results in 

So integrating by parts twice for each term of  yields

Since  shows that

So if  and 

Now the origin of the constraints  can be explained.  Here  is a generalization of the  defined above to possibly include monomials up to degree   In other words,

The equations

and

(where  denotes row  of ) are equivalent to the two systems of linear equations  and   Since  is invertible, the first system is equivalent to   So the first system implies the second system is equivalent to   Just as in the previous smoothing spline coefficient derivation, the top half of  becomes 

Because the integral is positive for all  the linear transformation resulting from the restriction of the domain of linear transformation  to  such that  must be positive definite. This fact enables transforming the polyharmonic smoothing spline equation system to a symmetric positive definite system of equations that can be solved twice as fast using the Cholesky decomposition.

Examples 
The next figure shows the interpolation through four points (marked by "circles") using different types of polyharmonic splines. The "curvature" of the interpolated curves grows with the order of the spline and the extrapolation at the left boundary (x < 0) is reasonable. The figure also includes the radial basis functions φ = exp(−r2) which gives a good interpolation as well. Finally, the figure includes also the non-polyharmonic spline phi = r2 to demonstrate, that this radial basis function is not able to pass through the predefined points (the linear equation has no solution and is solved in a least squares sense).

The next figure shows the same interpolation as in the first figure, with the only exception that the points to be interpolated are scaled by a factor of 100 (and the case phi = r2 is no longer included). Since φ = (scale·r)k = (scalek)·rk, the factor (scalek) can be extracted from matrix A of the linear equation system and therefore the solution is not influenced by the scaling. This is different for the logarithmic form of the spline, although the scaling has not much influence. This analysis is reflected in the figure, where the interpolation shows not much differences. Note, for other radial basis functions, such as φ = exp(−kr2) with k = 1, the interpolation is no longer reasonable and it would be necessary to adapt k.

The next figure shows the same interpolation as in the first figure, with the only exception that the polynomial term of the function is not taken into account (and the case phi = r2 is no longer included). As can be seen from the figure, the extrapolation for x < 0 is no longer as "natural" as in the first figure for some of the basis functions. This indicates, that the polynomial term is useful if extrapolation occurs.

Discussion 
The main advantage of polyharmonic spline interpolation is that usually very good interpolation results are obtained for scattered data without performing any "tuning", so automatic interpolation is feasible. This is not the case for other radial basis functions. For example, the Gaussian function  needs to be tuned, so that  is selected according to the underlying grid of the independent variables.

Main disadvantages are:

 To determine the weights, a dense linear system of equations must be solved.
 Evaluating the computed polyharmonic spline function at  data points requires  operations.

Recently, methods have been developed to overcome the aforementioned difficulties. For example Beatson et al. present a method to interpolate polyharmonic splines at one point in 3 dimensions in  operations instead of  operations.

See also 
 Inverse distance weighting 
 Radial basis function
 Subdivision surface (emerging alternative to spline-based surfaces)
 Spline

References 

Splines (mathematics)
Interpolation
Multivariate interpolation

External links 

Computer Code
 Polyharmonic Spline, An interactive example with Matlab/Octave source code